The 1924 Wyoming Cowboys football team was an American football team that represented the University of Wyoming as a member of the Rocky Mountain Conference (RMC) during the 1924 college football season. In their first season under head coach William Henry Dietz, the Cowboys compiled a 2–6 record (1–6 against conference opponents), finished last out of ten teams in the RMC, and were outscored by a total of 140 to 59. George Mabee was the team captain.

Schedule

References

Wyoming
Wyoming Cowboys football seasons
Wyoming Cowboys football